Caleb Brewster (September 12, 1747 – February 13, 1827) was a member of the Culper spy ring during the American Revolutionary War, reporting to General George Washington through Major Benjamin Tallmadge. He carried messages across Long Island Sound between Major Tallmadge and the ring's main spies on Long Island, New York, and in New York City. He also made direct reports to Washington concerning naval activities in the New York City area.

Personal life
Brewster was born in Setauket, New York, a hamlet of Brookhaven. After the Revolutionary War, he was a blacksmith, an officer in the United States Revenue Cutter Service for 20 years, and a farmer.  He was a descendant of Francis Brewster II, barber-surgeon of Castle Bristol, who died, presumably, on the Phantom Ship in 1646-1647 and was the son of Francis Brewster I of Wrentham Hall in Suffolk, yeoman, who died 1632 in Bristol, England.

Culper Ring

Major Benjamin Tallmadge convinced General George Washington on August 25, 1778, that Abraham Woodhull of Setauket, Long Island, would make a good agent to gather intelligence in New York City, the British Army's headquarters and base of operations during the American Revolutionary War. Brewster served as a courier in what became the Culper spy ring, carrying messages between Woodhull and Tallmadge, and he ran regular trips in whaleboats across the Sound on a variety of smuggling and military missions. Woodhull and Robert Townsend were the main agents in the Ring, alias "Samuel Culper, Sr." and "Samuel Culper, Jr." respectively.  Brewster also participated in military actions as a Continental Army officer serving under Tallmadge.

Anna Strong's role in the Ring was to signal Brewster that a message was ready, according to widely accepted local and family tradition. She did this by hanging a black petticoat on her clothesline at Strong Point in Setauket, which Brewster could see from a boat in the Sound and Woodhull could see from his nearby farm. She would add a number of handkerchiefs for one of six coves where Brewster would bring his boat and Woodhull would meet him.

In February 1778, Brewster sent a message of his own through the Culper channel that described flat-bottomed boats being built in New York that could be used to ferry troops, and Loyalist privateers being outfitted. On another trip, he was waiting for Woodhull in Anna Strong's back garden when he surprised a passing British lieutenant. Brewster pulled him off his horse and had the opportunity to capture or kill him, but he refrained from doing either in order to avoid drawing suspicion on Anna as a member of the Ring, and instead pretended that he and his men were thieves.

After the war
Brewster married Anne Lewis of Fairfield, Connecticut, after the war and moved to Fairfield with her, where he set up a blacksmith business. The couple had eight surviving children.

In 1793, he joined the United States Revenue Cutter Service, predecessor of the United States Coast Guard. He took three years off from the service because he disagreed with policies of President John Adams, and he commanded the revenue cutter USRC Active (1812) from 1812 to 1816. He retired to his farm in Black Rock, Connecticut.

Brewster died February 13, 1827, aged 79, and is buried in Fairfield Cemetery.

In popular culture
Caleb Brewster is played by Daniel Henshall in the TV series Turn: Washington's Spies, on AMC.

See also
Intelligence in the American Revolutionary War

Citations

References

External links
The Caleb Brewster letter correspondence including with George Washington

People of New York (state) in the American Revolution
People from Setauket, New York
American spies during the American Revolution
1747 births
1827 deaths